The Livingston Open is a defunct, Grand Prix tennis affiliated men's tennis tournament. It was played from 1984 to 1989, held in Livingston, New Jersey and played on outdoor hard courts at Newark Academy.

American Brad Gilbert won the singles title on two occasions, while fellow countryman Johan Kriek won it twice and Andre Agassi won it once.

Results

Singles

Doubles

References

External links
ATP Tour Website

 
Defunct tennis tournaments in the United States
Livingston
Grand Prix tennis circuit
Sports in New Jersey